Dyckia brevifolia, or sawblade, is a species of flowering plant in the Bromeliaceae family. This species is endemic to Brazil.

Cultivars
Dyckia 'Yellow Glow' is a cultivar of Dyckia brevifolia. Dyckia brevifolia is also one parent of the hybrid cultivars Dyckia 'Lad Cutak', Dyckia 'Naked Lady' and Dyckia 'Vista'.

References

BSI Cultivar Registry Retrieved 11 October 2009

brevifolia
Flora of Brazil
Taxa named by John Gilbert Baker